Dispatches is a British current affairs documentary programme on Channel 4, first broadcast on 30 October 1987. The programme covers issues about British society, politics, health, religion, international current affairs and the environment, and often features a mole inside organisations under journalistic investigation.

Awards

British Academy Television Awards
The British Academy Television Awards are presented in an award show hosted by the BAFTA. They have been awarded annually since 1955.

British Academy Television Craft Awards
The British Academy Television Craft Awards are accolades presented by the British Academy of Film and Television Arts, established in 2000 as a way to spotlight technical achievements.

RTS Awards
The Royal Television Society Awards are the gold standard of achievement in the television community. Each year six awards recognise excellence across the entire range of programme making and broadcasting skills.

Notable episodes

Young, Nazi and Proud

On the youth wing of the British National Party (BNP), produced in the UK by David Modell. It was originally broadcast on 4 November 2002 as the eight episode of the sixteenth season. The documentary won a BAFTA award in the 'Best Current Affairs' category.

The program focuses on then-chairman of Young BNP, Mark Collett. Interviews highlighted the ideological background of Collett, particularly his sympathetic stance towards the policies of Nazism and Adolf Hitler.

MMR: What They Didn't Tell you
Broadcast on 18 November 2004, MMR: What they didn't tell you featured an investigation by Sunday Times journalist Brian Deer into the campaign against the MMR vaccine by British surgeon Andrew Wakefield.  Among a string of allegations, Deer revealed that, when Wakefield claimed a possible link between the vaccine and autism, his own lab had produced secret results which contradicted his claims, and he had registered patent claims on his own single measles vaccine.

Following the programme, Wakefield, funded by the Medical Protection Society sued Channel 4, The Sunday Times and Deer personally for libel, but sought to have his lawsuit stayed by the court, so that he did not need to pursue it. The case became high-profile when Channel 4 obtained a court order compelling Wakefield to continue with his lawsuit or abandon it. During two years of litigation, three High Court judgments were obtained against Wakefield from Mr Justice David Eady, including new law that the General Medical Council was required to supply materials from its own investigations to defendants facing libel actions from doctors. In his first judgment, Eady said:

In pleadings submitted to the court, Channel 4 spelt out what they said the programme had alleged. It said that Wakefield:
 Had dishonestly and irresponsibly spread fear that the MMR vaccine might cause autism in some children, even though he knew that his own laboratory's tests dramatically contradicted his claims and he knew or ought to have known that there was absolutely no scientific basis at all for his belief that MMR should be broken up into single vaccines.
 In spreading such fear, also acted dishonestly and irresponsibly, by repeatedly failing to disclose conflicts of interest and/or material information, including his association with contemplated litigation against the manufacturers of MMR and his application for a patent for a vaccine for measles which, if effective, and if the MMR vaccine had been undermined and/or withdrawn on safety grounds, would have been commercially very valuable.
 Caused medical colleagues serious unease by carrying out research tests on vulnerable children outside the terms or in breach of the permission given by an ethics committee, in particular by subjecting those children to highly invasive and sometimes distressing clinical procedures and thereby abusing them.
 Has been unremittingly evasive and dishonest in an effort to cover up his wrongdoing.
In January 2007, Wakefield discontinued his claim and paid Channel 4's and Deer's costs.

Undercover Mosque

Undercover Mosque was first aired on 15 January 2007. The film caused a furore in Britain and the world press due to the content of the released footage. The documentary presents film footage gathered from 12 months of secret investigation into mosques throughout Britain.

West Midlands Police launched an investigation, immediately after the programme was transmitted, into whether criminal offences had been committed by those teaching or preaching at the mosques and other establishments. They presented their evidence to the Crown Prosecution Service who advised that "a realistic prospect of a conviction was unlikely".

However Bethan David of the CPS agreed with West Midlands Police Assistant Chief Constable Anil Patani (security and cohesion) that a damaging and distorting impression had been given of the speakers by the programme. On 7 August 2007 the CPS issued a statement:

The police investigation initially looked at whether there had been any criminal offences committed by those featured in the programme and following careful consideration by the Crown Prosecution Service (CPS), West Midlands Police have been advised that there is insufficient evidence to bring charges against those individuals featured within the programme.

"West Midlands Police acknowledge the concerns that some parts of the programme may have been considered offensive, however when analysed in their full context there was not enough evidence to bring criminal charges against any individual. ACC Anil Patani for West Midlands Police said: "As a result of our initial findings, the investigation was then extended to include issues relating to the editing and portrayal of the documentary. The priority for West Midlands Police has been to investigate the documentary and it’s making with as much rigour as the extremism the programme sought to portray".

"The police investigation concentrated on three speakers and their comments in the programme. CPS reviewing lawyer Bethan David considered 56 hours of media footage of which only a small part was used in the programme. She said: "The splicing together of extracts from longer speeches appears to have completely distorted what the speakers were saying. "The CPS has demonstrated that it will not hesitate to prosecute those responsible for criminal incitement. But in this case we have been dealing with a heavily edited television programme, apparently taking out of context aspects of speeches, which, in their totality, could never provide a realistic prospect of any convictions".

"The CPS was also asked by the police to consider whether a prosecution under the Public Order Act 1986 should be brought against Channel 4 for broadcasting a programme including material likely to stir up racial hatred. Miss David advised West Midlands Police that on the evidence available, there was insufficient evidence that racial hatred had been stirred up as a direct consequence of the programme. It would also be necessary to identify a key individual responsible for doing this together with an intent to stir up racial hatred, which was not possible."

West Midlands Police then complained to Ofcom that the programme had been subject to such an intensity of editing that those who had been featured in the programme had been misrepresented (creating an unfair, unjust and inaccurate perception of both some speakers and sections of the Muslim community within the West Midlands); the footage had been edited in a way that resulted in material being broadcast in a form so altered from the form originally delivered that it was "sufficient to undermine community cohesion"; and the programme was "likely to undermine feelings of public reassurance and safety of those communities in the West Midlands for which the Chief Constable has a responsibility".

The resulting complaints to Ofcom were rejected by Ofcom on 19 November 2007. "Undercover Mosque was a legitimate investigation, uncovering matters of important public interest... On the evidence (including untransmitted footage and scripts), Ofcom found that the broadcaster had accurately represented the material it had gathered and dealt with the subject matter responsibly and in context." Ofcom also did not uphold complaints from the Kingdom of Saudi Arabia & the Royal Embassy of Saudi Arabia, from the Islamic Cultural Centre, and from the London Central Mosque. In a move supported by Channel Four, the makers of the documentary then launched a libel action against the CPS and West Midlands Police. In a statement released for Kevin Sutcliffe and programme makers Hardcash Productions said:

On 15 May 2008 when the matter came to the High Court, West Midlands Police and the Crown Prosecution Service apologised to the makers of the documentary for accusing them of distortion and agreed to a payment of £100,000. The statement, released to the media by West Midlands Police, after the High Court hearing, said they now accepted there had been no evidence that Channel 4 or the documentary makers had "misled the audience or that the programme was likely to encourage or incite criminal activity".

It added that the Ofcom report showed the documentary had "accurately represented the material it had gathered and dealt with the subject matter responsibly and in context". The police statement concluded: "We accept, without reservation, the conclusions of Ofcom and apologise to the programme makers for the damage and distress caused by our original press release." The same statement was later posted on the Crown Prosecution Service website.

Kevin Sutcliffe, deputy head of current affairs at Channel 4, said the apology was a vindication of the programme team in exposing extreme views.
"Channel 4 was fully aware of the sensitivities surrounding the subject matter but recognised the programme's findings were clearly a matter of important public interest. The authorities should be doing all they can to encourage investigations like this, not attempting to publicly rubbish them for reasons they have never properly explained," he said. Channel 4 boss Julian Bellamy said they had had no choice but to pursue action when the police and CPS refused to withdraw their remarks.

The National Secular Society subsequently called for a Public Enquiry into the role of the West Midlands Police and the CPS in referring the matter to Ofcom in the first place. Keith Porteous Wood, Executive Director of the National Secular Society, said: "While the Police and CPS have now apologised, they have yet to explain why this apology was not issued in response to the widespread public outcry during 2007 about their targeting of Channel 4 or even to the total rejection by OFCOM of Police/CPS complaints on 19 November 2007. It had to be forced on them by the courts. The intransigence of the Police and CPS has seriously undermined public confidence in both institutions."

Undercover Mosque: The Return

This programme is a sequel to the Undercover Mosque programme broadcast on 15 January 2007 in the UK. The programme uses footage filmed by undercover reporters in UK Mosques and Islamic institutions as well as interviews with Muslim academics and prominent figures.

One of the people quoted in the programme was Khalid Yasin. His videos were found to be on sale in the Regent's Park mosque bookshop espousing extremist views such as public beheadings, amputations, lashings and crucifixions. He is quoted in the programme as saying: "and then people can see, people without hands, people can see in public heads rolling down the street, people can see in public people got their hands and feet from opposite sides chopped off and they see them crucified, they see people get punished they see people put up against the pole ?...and because they see it, it acts as a deterrent for them because they say I don't want that to happen to me." He published a response to a letter from the producer of the programme calling them "hypocritical and exploitative bigots, [you are] audacious liars and opportunistic media vermin" and "unethical [and] merchants of journalistic vomit".

Saving Africa's Witch Children

This programme first aired 12 November 2008 and told the story of young children who had been labeled witches and wizards by their family and community and left abandoned, tortured, imprisoned or killed in the Akwa Ibom in Nigeria. The programme followed Sam Itauma, a Nigerian who started a school for the abandoned children called CRARN (Child Rights and Rehabilitation Network) and Englishman Gary Foxcroft who started the charity, to support the school. The programme suggests that the problem is caused by a combination of African traditional beliefs and extreme Christian Pentecostal groups. In particular the programme singles out Liberty Foundation Gospel Ministries for producing a film called "End of the Wicked" which the charity workers blame for the increase in children being abandoned by their families.

Undercover Teacher
Airing in 2005, this episode was about a qualified science teacher, Alex Dolan, who went undercover in schools in Leeds and London to expose the 'appalling teaching'. One school in particular, Highbury Grove School, was shocked and angry at the programme's findings. Head-teacher Truda White said in an interview with the Guardian:

Ryanair Caught Napping
Aired on 13 February 2006, this episode saw two undercover reporters obtained jobs as cabin crew, based at Ryanair's operations at London Stansted Airport and spent 5 months secretly recording the training programme and cabin crew procedures. The documentary criticised Ryanair's training policies, security procedures and aircraft hygiene, and highlighted poor staff morale. It claims to have filmed Ryanair cabin crew sleeping on the job; using aftershave to cover the smell of vomit in the aisle, rather than cleaning it up; ignoring warning alerts on the emergency slide; encouraging staff to falsify references for airport security passes; asking staff not to recheck passengers' passports before they board flights; and a captain of the airline saying that he would lose his job (or get demoted), if he allowed the cabin crew to serve complimentary non-alcoholic drinks and snacks to passengers, during a 3-hour delay in Spain. Staff in training were allegedly falsely told that any Boeing 737-200 (now no longer in service with Ryanair) impact would result in the death of the passenger sitting in seat 1A and that they should not pass this information on to the passenger.

Ryanair denied the allegations and published its correspondence with Dispatches on its website. It also alleged that the programme was misleading and that promotional materials, in particular a photograph of a stewardess sleeping, had been faked by Dispatches.

Gaza: The Killing Zone
This episode, broadcast in May 2003, follows five weeks in the lives of those living in the Gaza Strip. Beginning two days after the killing of Rachel Corrie, an American member of the International Solidarity Movement, by an IDF bulldozer, the film includes footage of the aftermath of an Israeli flechette attack in a densely populated area and documents the deaths of Tom Hurndall, a British ISM activist, and James Miller, the Channel 4 cameraman who was shot as he filmed Israeli troops bulldozing Palestinian homes.

Inside Britain's Israel Lobby
Broadcast on 16 November 2009, this episode investigated what was argued to be "one of the most powerful and influential political lobbies in Britain", the Israel Lobby, and in particular the Conservative Friends of Israel (CFI).The documentary claimed that donations to the Conservative Party "from all CFI members and their businesses add up to well over £10m over the last eight years". CFI disputed this figure and called the film "deeply flawed", saying that they had only donated £30,000 between 2004 and 2009, but accepting that members of the group had undoubtedly made their own donations to the party.

Dispatches also covered the Israel Lobby's alleged influence on the BBC and other British media and further claimed that many media outlets were frightened of broaching the lobby.  The Conservative MP Michael Mates said: "The pro-Israel lobby … is the most powerful political lobby. There's nothing to touch them."

Ofcom received 50 complaints about the programme but cleared it of breaching broadcasting rules.

How Councils Blow Your Millions
"Reporter Antony Barnett uncovers unknown deals between cash-strapped councils and banks that are costing taxpayers millions of pounds a year"
Broadcast on 6 July 2015 at 20:00, this episode investigated the use of long term lender option borrower option loans by UK councils, provided by banks. The programme unearthed upfront profits made by the banks and high interest rates, with research from Debt Resistance UK. As a direct consequence, councils are having to cut services for residents.

Web-exclusive broadcasts 
 War Torn - Stories of Separation
 I4I - Films by AJ Nakasila

References

External links

[https://www.channel4.com/collection/dispatches Dispatches] at Channel 4
Dispatches at the British Film Institute (BFI) Film & TV Database | archive
 Episode guide | archive

 
1987 British television series debuts
1980s British documentary television series
1990s British documentary television series
2000s British documentary television series
2010s British documentary television series
2020s British documentary television series
British television news shows
Channel 4 documentary series
Current affairs shows
English-language television shows
International Emmy Awards Current Affairs & News winners